Established in 1964, by José Mª Ginjaume Mencerré, Marian Garriga and Jaume Lerma, St. Peter's School is a bilingual school located in Barcelona, Spain.

Overview
St. Peter's School offers three IB programmes, validated by the International Baccalaureate: the Primary Years Programme, the Middle Years Programme and the Diploma Programme. It is the only IB World School in Barcelona that offers all three programmes. The school is accredited by the Spanish Ministry of Education, the Generalitat de Catalunya, and by the Best Schools in Spain CICAE. Students can also take the International Cambridge Examinations in secondary education and during pre-university education, as well as external examinations to acquire certificates in Languages (ESOL in English, and DELF in French).

School Structure 
Nursery (1 & 2 years)
Segundo de infantil (Preschool 2) - Foundation Stage (3 to 5 years) & Primary school (6 to 9 years)
Secondary school (10 to 14 years)
Pre-university education (15 to 18 years) - IB Diploma Programme

Faculty 
The St Peter's School staff includes 89 faculty members (teachers and learning assistants), 21 support staff, administrators and support center personnel.

English native speakers: 50%
Spanish native speakers: 45%
Other: 5%

Multilingual environment 

From nursery to primary five, English is the medium of instruction in the classroom. Spanish is introduced gradually once students enter secondary education, next to Catalan and French (starting from primary five). The school also offers Chinese Mandarin as an after-school activity.

PISA Results 
The Program for the International Assessment of Students (PISA) was promoted by the OECD (Organization for Economic Cooperation and Development). These tests evaluate the ability to apply learned knowledge and skills in real-life situations, in order to reason and communicate more effectively.

Graduates 
These are the graduates of St. Peter's School, Barcelona earn the International Baccalaureate Diploma. They also achieve university-level language qualifications: Cambridge Certificates in English, Level C in Catalan, Spanish proficiency level, DELF B2 in French and a basic level of German.

References

External links
St. Peter's School website
International Baccalaureate 
Best School in Spain 
CICAE
Cambridge English
CEFR

International schools in Barcelona
Educational institutions established in 1964
1964 establishments in Spain
Bilingual schools